The 1970 National Invitation Tournament was the 1971 edition of the annual NCAA college basketball competition. It was unique in that coach Al McGuire of Marquette University, unhappy with his team's placement, turned down a bid to the NCAA tournament and elected to play in the NIT instead. His Marquette Warriors went on to claim the championship.

Marquette was ranked 8th and received an at-large bid to the NCAA tournament. The NCAA slotted Marquette into the Midwest regional rather than the closer Mideast regional. McGuire was so displeased about this that Marquette actually turned down the NCAA bid and chose to instead play in the NIT. The NCAA no longer allows a school to turn down a bid to the NCAA tournament in order to play in another postseason tournament. 

This tournament represented the final college games for LSU great Pete Maravich, the NCAA's all-time leading scorer. Maravich finished his three-year career with 3,667 points, 44.2 per game, records which stand through the 2021-22 season, despite the reinstitution of freshman eligibility and the introduction of the shot clock and 3-point shot. It was LSU's only postseason appearance between 1954 and 1979.

Selected teams
Sixteen teams were selected for the 1970 NIT.

 Army
 Cincinnati
 Duke
 Duquesne
 Georgetown
 Georgia Tech
 LSU
 Louisville
 Manhattan
 Marquette
 Massachusetts
 Miami (OH)
 North Carolina
 Oklahoma
 St. John's
 Utah

Bracket

See also
 1970 NCAA University Division basketball tournament
 1970 NCAA College Division basketball tournament
 1970 NAIA Division I men's basketball tournament
 1970 National Women's Invitational Tournament

References

National Invitation
National Invitation Tournament
1970s in Manhattan
Basketball in New York City
College sports in New York City
Madison Square Garden
National Invitation Tournament
National Invitation Tournament
Sports competitions in New York City
Sports in Manhattan